Samai Amari (born 26 September 1980) is an Indonesian former professional racing cyclist.

Major results

2003
 1st Stages 2, 6 & 7 Jelajah Malaysia
2004
 1st Stage 7 Tour of Sunraysia
2005
 1st  Criterium, Southeast Asian Games
 1st Stages 3 & 5 Tour of East Java
2007
 1st  Kilometer, UCI World B Track Cycling Championships
2009
 1st Stage 4 Tour de Langkawi

External links

1980 births
Living people
Indonesian male cyclists
Cyclists at the 2002 Asian Games
Cyclists at the 2006 Asian Games
Southeast Asian Games medalists in cycling
Southeast Asian Games bronze medalists for Indonesia
Competitors at the 2007 Southeast Asian Games
Asian Games competitors for Indonesia
20th-century Indonesian people
21st-century Indonesian people